East Galway can mean:

 A Dáil Éireann constituency, see Galway East (Dáil constituency)
 The eastern area of County Galway
 A former UK Parliament constituency 1885–1922, see East Galway (UK Parliament constituency)